Gustavus Cox (30 May 1870 – 9 September 1958) was a Barbadian cricketer. He played in eighteen first-class matches for the Barbados cricket team from 1893 to 1905.

See also
 List of Barbadian representative cricketers

References

External links
 

1870 births
1958 deaths
Barbadian cricketers
Barbados cricketers
People from Saint Michael, Barbados